The Roman Catholic Diocese of Allahabad is a diocese with its see located in the city of Allahabad in the Ecclesiastical province of Agra in India.  Diocese of Allahabad is spread over 13 districts of Uttar Pradesh. These are Prayagraj, Ambedkarnagar, Amethi, Faizabad, Fatehpur, Kanpur City, Kanpur Dehat, Kaushambi, Mirzapur, Pratapgarh, Rae Bareli, Sonbhadra and Sultanpur.

History
 1845: Established as Apostolic Vicariate of Patna from the Apostolic Vicariate of Tibet-Hindustan
 1 September 1886: Promoted as Diocese of Allahabad

Leadership
 Diocesean Administrator of Allahabad (Latin Rite)
Rev. Fr. Louis Mascarenhas (2 February 2021 - present)
 Apostolic Administrator of Allahabad (Latin Rite)
Bishop Ignatius Menezes (1 February 2013 - 2 December 2013)
 Bishops of Allahabad (Latin Rite)
Bishop Mar Raphy Manjaly (3 December 2013 – 11 November 2020) - Syro Malabar Catholic Rite
 Bishop Isidore Fernandes (5 May 1988 – 31 January 2013)
 Bishop Baptist Mudartha (1 March 1976 – 5 May 1988)
 Bishop Alfred Fernández (25 June 1970 – 15 December 1975)
 Bishop Raymond D’Mello (21 April 1964 – 20 December 1969)
 Bishop Leonard Joseph Raymond (later Archbishop) (10 April 1947 – 16 January 1964)
 Bishop Joseph Angel Poli, O.F.M. Cap. (later Archbishop) (18 December 1917 – 11 July 1946)
 Bishop Pierre-François Gramigna, O.F.M. Cap. (25 August 1904 – 18 December 1917)
 Bishop Victor Gaetano Sinibaldi, O.F.M. Cap. (27 September 1899 – 5 January 1902)
 Bishop Charles Joseph Gentili, O.F.M. Cap. (later Archbishop) (29 March 1897 – 27 August 1898)
 Bishop Francis Pesci, O.F.M. Cap. (1 September 1886 – 9 July 1896)

Saints and causes for canonisation
 Ven. Anastasius Hartmann, Apostolic Vicar of Patna, which was later promoted as the diocese of Allahabad

References

External links
 GCatholic.org 
 Catholic Hierarchy 

Roman Catholic dioceses in India
Religious organizations established in 1845
Christianity in Uttar Pradesh
Allahabad
Roman Catholic dioceses and prelatures established in the 19th century
1845 establishments in British India